The 2001 Judgment Day was the third Judgment Day professional wrestling pay-per-view (PPV) event produced by the World Wrestling Federation (WWF, now WWE). It was sponsored by RC Cola. The event took place on May 20, 2001, at the ARCO Arena in Sacramento, California. It was the final Judgment Day promoted under the WWF name as the promotion was renamed to World Wrestling Entertainment (WWE) in May 2002. It was also the last Judgment Day held before the introduction of the brand extension in March 2002.

Seven professional wrestling matches were featured on the event's card. The main event was "Stone Cold" Steve Austin defending the WWF Championship against The Undertaker in a No Holds Barred match. The featured bouts on the undercard included Triple H defending the Intercontinental Championship against Kane in a Chain match, and a Two-out-of three falls match between Kurt Angle and Chris Benoit for Angle's 1996 Olympic Gold Medals.

The event grossed over $670,000 in ticket sales from an attendance of 13,623, which was higher than the previous year's event.

Production

Background
Judgment Day was first held as the 25th In Your House pay-per-view (PPV) in October 1998; In Your House was a series of monthly PPV shows first produced by the World Wrestling Federation (WWF, now WWE) in May 1995. The In Your House branding was retired following February 1999's St. Valentine's Day Massacre: In Your House event, as the company moved to install permanent names for each of its monthly PPVs. After two years, Judgment Day returned in May 2000 as its own PPV, replacing Over the Edge, thus establishing Judgment Day as the annual May PPV for the promotion. The 2001 event was the third event in the Judgment Day chronology and was held on May 20 at the ARCO Arena in Sacramento, California.

Storylines
The event featured seven professional wrestling matches with outcomes predetermined by the WWF's creative writers. Wrestlers portrayed either a villainous or fan-favorite role as they followed a series of events which build tension, leading to a wrestling match. The name of a wrestler's character was not always the person's birth name, as wrestlers often use a stage name to portray their character.

The main event at Judgment Day featured a No Holds Barred match, a match with no disqualifications nor countouts, in which Stone Cold Steve Austin defended the WWF Championship against The Undertaker. The buildup to the match began on the April 30 episode of Raw Is War, Austin retained the WWF Championship against Undertaker, though by disqualification after executing a low blow on Undertaker, thus resulting in the decision. In the following weeks, Undertaker attacked Austin, and at one point taking his vest and the WWF Championship. Around that time, The Undertaker, received a phone call stating that his wife, Sara, had been involved in a car accident. The Undertaker found out that everything was okay and that there had not been a car accident at all. The Undertaker began to hunt down whoever made the phone call. On the May 17 episode of SmackDown!, during Undertaker's match with Triple H, Austin appeared on the Titantron and admitted that he and Triple H were the ones who had made the phone call. During the early part of the pay-per-view, Undertaker threatened to inflict bodily harm on Commissioner William Regal unless he made the title match a No Holds Barred match, which Regal did.

The buildup to the Two-out-of-three falls match started after Chris Benoit stole Kurt Angle's medals by picking them up from the ring after throwing Angle over the top rope and out of the ring. This rivalry escalated more when Benoit announced that he was going to keep the gold medals in a "safe" and "warm" place, which turned out to be in the crotch of his tights. On the following SmackDown!, Angle faced Benoit and retrieved his medals, but when he went to kiss them he was repulsed by Benoit's crotch odor, which gave Benoit enough time to apply the Crippler Crossface on Angle. Angle dropped the medals and submitted, and on the following Raw Is War Angle challenged Benoit to a Two-out-of-three falls match. The first fall would be a pinfalls-only match, and the second a submission match. If the third fall was needed, it would be contested as a ladder match.

One main event at Judgment Day featured a Chain match, with Triple H defending his WWF Intercontinental Championship against Kane. The buildup to the match all started after WrestleMania X-Seven on the April 5 episode of SmackDown! when Triple H won the Intercontinental title by defeating Chris Jericho after WWF Commissioner William Regal interfered. Two weeks later on SmackDown!, Triple H and Stone Cold Steve Austin interfered in Kane's WWF Hardcore Championship defense against Rhyno by injuring his left arm with multiple steel chair shots, enabling Rhyno to win the title. At Backlash, WWF Champion, Austin and WWF Intercontinental Champion, Triple H defeated The Undertaker and Kane to win the WWF Tag Team Championship in a tag team match, in which Austin's WWF title and Triple H's Intercontinental title were also on the line after interference from both Stephanie McMahon-Helmsley and her father Vince McMahon. The following night on Monday Night's Raw Is War, Kane was scheduled to challenge Austin for the WWF Championship, but Kane was attacked backstage by Austin and Triple H before the match even started. Therefore, The Undertaker replaced Kane in the WWF Title match and defeated Austin by disqualification, but did not win the WWF Title because of the disqualification. Afterward, Kane came down to the ring to save The Undertaker from the assault given to him by Austin and Triple H, but Kane ended up being put out of action for two weeks after Austin and Triple H targeted his left arm. Kane returned on the May 10 episode of SmackDown! and saved Undertaker from an assault by Austin. On the May 14 episode of Raw Is War, Triple H announced a chain match for the WWF Intercontinental title between himself and Kane at Judgment Day.

Event

Before the event began, a match took place on Heat, in which Raven defeated Val Venis.

In another Heat match, The Holly Cousins (Hardcore Holly and Crash Holly) defeated Kaientai (Taka Michinoku and Funaki).

Preliminary matches
The event opened with WWF commissioner William Regal facing Rikishi. Regal performed a Regal Cutter on Rikishi to win the match.

Next, Kurt Angle faced Chris Benoit in a Two-out-of-three falls match for Angle's Olympic Gold Medal, with the first fall being a Singles match. Angle performed Rolling German Suplexes on Benoit and attempted a Diving Headbutt but Benoit avoided. Benoit performed an Angle Slam on Angle to win the first fall. The second fall was a Submission match. Angle performed an Angle Slam on Benoit and forced Benoit to submit to the Ankle Lock to win the second fall. The third fall was a Ladder match. Benoit applied a Crippler Crossface on Angle, who passed out. Edge and Christian interfered, attacking Benoit. Angle retrieved his Olympic Gold Medal to win the match.

After that, Rhyno defended the WWF Hardcore Championship against Test and Big Show. Show and Test started fighting before Rhyno got involved. Test attempted to strangle Show with a rope but Rhyno stopped Test. Rhyno performed a Gore on Big Show to retain the title.

Next, Chyna defended the WWF Women's Championship against Lita. Chyna performed a Powerbomb on Lita to retain the title. Late in the match, Eddie Guerrero came out to watch. After the match, Chyna and Lita hugged out of respect.

After that, Triple H defended the WWF Intercontinental Championship against Kane in a Chain match. WWF Champion Steve Austin interfered, allowing Triple H to attack Kane with a low blow. Austin accidentally hit Triple H with a steel chair, allowing Kane to pin Triple H to win the title.

Later was a Tag team turmoil match to determine who would be the #1 Contenders to the WWF Tag Team Championship. Dean Malenko and Perry Saturn were eliminated by The APA (Bradshaw and Faarooq) after Faarooq pinned Saturn following a Spinebuster. The Dudley Boyz (Bubba Ray Dudley and D-Von Dudley) were eliminated by the APA after Bradshaw pinned Bubba following a Clothesline From Hell. The APA were eliminated by X-Factor (X-Pac and Justin Credible) after Albert tripped Bradshaw, allowing X-Pac to pin him. The Hardy Boyz (Matt Hardy and Jeff Hardy) were eliminated by X-Factor after X-Pac and Credible performed a double Superkick on Matt. X-Factor were eliminated by Chris Jericho and Chris Benoit after X-Pac submitted to the Walls of Jericho by Jericho and the Crippler Crossface by Benoit, which were applied simultaneously. Edge and Christian were eliminated by Jericho and Benoit after Benoit forced Christian to submit to the Crippler Crossface, meaning Jericho and Benoit won the match, and #1 Contendership for the WWF Tag Team Championship in the near future.

Main event
In the main event, Stone Cold Steve Austin defended the WWF Championship against The Undertaker in a No Holds Barred match. Undertaker performed a Chokeslam through the announce table on Austin. Austin struck Undertaker with a chair and performed a Stone Cold Stunner on Undertaker for a near-fall. Undertaker performed a Chokeslam on Austin and struck Austin with a chair. Triple H attempted to interfere but Undertaker struck Triple H with the chair. Undertaker attempted a Last Ride on Austin but Triple H struck Undertaker with a sledgehammer. Austin pinned Undertaker to retain the title.

Aftermath
By virtue of their victory in the tag team turmoil match, Chris Benoit and Chris Jericho were given a match against The Power Trip (Stone Cold Steve Austin and Triple H) for the WWF Tag Team Championship on the next night's Raw. During the match, Triple H misstepped while breaking a submission hold on Austin and tore one of his quadriceps. Late in the contest, Triple H tried to break up a pin by striking Jericho with his sledgehammer, but Jericho moved and Austin was hit in the chest instead. He was then pinned, which cost the Power Trip their tag team titles. Triple H went on to miss the rest of the year, while Austin began feuding with both Benoit and Jericho by himself. Austin would eventually cost Benoit and Jericho their titles when he assisted the Dudley Boyz in defeating them just before King of the Ring. At King of the Ring, Austin defeated Benoit and Jericho in a Triple Threat Match to retain the WWF Championship. The feud came to an abrupt end, however, after Benoit suffered a broken neck during the match and was out of action for nearly a year.

With their respective feud ending, The Brothers of Destruction moved on to other endeavors. Kane would eventually lose the Intercontinental Championship to Albert while The Undertaker began a feud with a mystery man who had been stalking his wife. That man unmasked himself as Diamond Dallas Page, and the two would feud off and on for the next several months as the Invasion began.

Judgment Day would become Chyna's final match with the promotion as she left the WWF over a contract dispute soon after the pay-per-view. The Women's Championship would remain inactive until November 18, 2001 at Survivor Series where a 6-Pack Challenge between Trish Stratus, Lita, Jacqueline, Ivory, Mighty Molly and a debuting Jazz would determine the new champion. The championship was ultimately won by Stratus at the event.

The 2001 Judgment Day was the last held under the WWF name, as the promotion was renamed to World Wrestling Entertainment (WWE) in May 2002. It was also the last Judgment Day held before the promotion introduced the brand extension in March 2002, a storyline subdivision in which the promotion divided its roster into two separate brands, Raw and SmackDown!, where wrestlers were exclusively assigned to perform.

Results

Tag team turmoil match

References

External links
Official Judgment Day 2001 website
ARCO Arena: Fun Facts & Information

2001
Events in Sacramento, California
Professional wrestling in Sacramento, California
2001 in California
Events in California
2001 WWF pay-per-view events
May 2001 events in the United States